Air Commodore James Lloyd Findlay  (6 October 1895 – 17 March 1983) was a New Zealand soldier and air force officer who served in both World Wars.

Early life and family
Findlay was born in Wellington, New Zealand in 1895, the second son of Sir John Findlay, and was educated at Wellington College.

First World War
Findlay had been studying in England at the outbreak of the First World War and was commissioned as an officer in the East Surrey Regiment. He distinguished himself during the Battle of Loos in September 1915 and the Battle of the Somme in July 1916, and was decorated with the Military Cross and mentioned in despatches. Findlay was also awarded the Croix de Chevalier of the Légion d’honneur by France in recognition of his gallantry. Findlay was wounded during the opening stages of the Battle of the Somme, but after recuperating joined the Royal Flying Corps as a pilot in March 1917.

His brother, Second Lieutenant Ian Calcutt Findlay, 2nd Battalion York and Lancaster Regiment had died of wounds at the 16th Field Ambulance Advanced dressing Station, Belgium on 10 August 1915, aged 18.

Findlay served with the Royal Flying Corps throughout the war, but after transferring to the Royal Air Force on inception in 1918 he was demobilised in August 1921.

Inter-war period
Findlay was married on 17 August 1921 in London to Ruby Violet Finch, youngest daughter of Thomas Alexander Finch of Trinity College, Dublin, after which they both returned to New Zealand.

In June 1923 Findlay was one of the first officers to enlist in the New Zealand Permanent Air Force and commanded Base Wigram from 1926 to 1938.

During his time in Christchurch he played cricket during the 1925–1926 season for Canterbury. He was a right-handed batsman and slow left-arm orthodox bowler.

He was awarded the King George V Silver Jubilee Medal in 1935 and the Coronation Medal in 1937. Findlay was promoted to wing commander in January 1938 and proceeded for attachment to the Royal Air Force as an exchange officer.

Second World War
Attached to the RAF at the beginning of the Second World War he commanded No. 48 Squadron and RAF Hooton Park until recalled to New Zealand. After service at the New Zealand Air Department as Deputy Chief of the Air Staff he was appointed Air Officer Commanding Central Group in September 1942. Findlay was subsequently posted as New Zealand Head of the Joint Staff Mission and RNZAF Representative to Combined Chiefs of Staff, Washington DC, USA. He was appointed a Commander of the Order of the British Empire in the 1944 King's Birthday honours, and for his services in the United States he was awarded the United States Legion of Merit on 7 November 1946.

His son, Ian Thomas Findlay, was a spitfire pilot killed in action over Yugoslavia on 12 Jan 1944.

Post-war
Findlay retired as an air commodore in 1954 after 10 years service as New Zealand Air Attaché in Washington DC. He died at Richmond, Surrey, England on 17 Mar 1983.

References

1895 births
1983 deaths
New Zealand recipients of the Military Cross
New Zealand Commanders of the Order of the British Empire
Chevaliers of the Légion d'honneur
New Zealand recipients of the Légion d'honneur
East Surrey Regiment officers
Royal Flying Corps officers
Royal Air Force personnel of World War I
Royal New Zealand Air Force personnel
New Zealand commanders
New Zealand people of World War I
New Zealand military personnel of World War I
New Zealand military personnel of World War II
New Zealand military personnel
Foreign recipients of the Legion of Merit
People educated at Wellington College (New Zealand)
Canterbury cricketers
New Zealand cricketers